In linguistics, an allomorph is a variant phonetic form of a morpheme, or, a unit of meaning that varies in sound and spelling without changing the meaning. The term allomorph describes the realization of phonological variations for a specific morpheme. The different allomorphs that a morpheme can become are governed by morphophonemic rules. These phonological rules determine what phonetic form, or specific pronunciation, a morpheme will take based on the phonological or morphological context in which they appear.

In English
English has several morphemes that vary in sound but not in meaning, such as past tense morphemes, plural morphemes, and negative morphemes.

Past tense allomorphs 
For example, an English past tense morpheme is -ed, which occurs in several allomorphs depending on its phonological environment by assimilating the voicing of the previous segment or the insertion of a schwa after an alveolar stop:

The "other than" restrictions above are typical for allomorphy. If the allomorphy conditions are ordered from most restrictive (in this case, after an alveolar stop) to least restrictive, the first matching case usually has precedence. Thus, the above conditions could be rewritten as follows:

as  when the stem ends with voiceless phonemes
as  elsewhere

The  allomorph does not appear after stem-final  although the latter is voiceless, which is then explained by  appearing in that environment, together with the fact that the environments are ordered. Likewise, the  allomorph does not appear after stem-final  because the earlier clause for the  allomorph has priority. The  allomorph does not appear after stem-final voiceless phoneme because the preceding clause for the  comes first.

Irregular past tense forms, such as "broke" or "was/were," can be seen as still more specific cases since they are confined to certain lexical items, such as the verb "break," which take priority over the general cases listed above.

Plural allomorphs 
The plural morpheme for regular nouns in English is typically realized by adding an s or es to the end of the noun. However, the plural morpheme actually has three different allomorphs: [s], [z], and [əz]. The specific pronunciation that a plural morpheme takes on is determined by the following morphological rules:

 Assume that the basic form of the plural morpheme, /z/, is [z] ("bags" /bægz/)
 The morpheme /z/ becomes [əz] by inserting an [ə] before [z] when a noun ends in a sibilant ("buses" /bʌsəz/)
 Change the morpheme /z/ to a voiceless [s] when a noun ends in a voiceless sound ("caps" /kæps/)

Negative allomorphs 
In English, the negative prefix in has three allomorphs: [ɪn], [ɪŋ], and [ɪm]. The phonetic form that the negative morpheme /ɪn/ uses is determined by the following morphological rules:

 the negative morpheme /ɪn/ becomes [ɪn] when preceding an alveolar consonant ("intolerant"/ɪn'tɔlərənt/)
 the morpheme /ɪn/ becomes [ɪŋ] before a velar consonant ("incongruous" /ɪŋ'kɔŋgruəs/)
 the morpheme /ɪn/ becomes [ɪm] before a bilabial consonant ("improper" /ɪm'prɔpər/)

In Sami languages
The Sami languages have a trochaic pattern of alternating stressed and unstressed syllables. The vowels and consonants that are allowed in an unstressed syllable differ from those that are allowed in a stressed syllable. Consequently, every suffix and inflectional ending has two forms, and the form that is used depends on the stress pattern of the word to which it is attached. For example, Northern Sami has the causative verb suffix - in which - is selected when it would be the third syllable (and the preceding verb has two syllables), and - is selected when it would be the third and the fourth syllables (and the preceding verb has three syllables):
The same applies to inflectional patterns in the Sami languages as well, which are divided into even stems and odd stems.

Stem allomorphy
Allomorphy can also exist in stems or roots, as in Classical Sanskrit:

The form of the stem , found in the nominative singular and locative plural, is the etymological form of the morpheme. Pre-Indic palatalization of velars resulted in the variant form , which was initially phonologically conditioned.

Thus, allomorphy was no longer directly relatable to phonological processes.

Phonological conditioning also accounts for the  form in the instrumental plural, in which the  assimilates in voicing to the following .

History
The term was originally used to describe variations in chemical structure. It was first applied to language (in writing) in 1948, by Fatih Şat and Sibel Merve in Language XXIV.

See also
Null allomorph
Alternation (linguistics)
Allophone
Consonant mutation
Grassmann's law
Suppletion

References
 

Linguistic morphology
Units of linguistic morphology
Linguistics terminology